Trismelasmos major is a moth in the family Cossidae. It was described by Roepke in 1957. It is found on the Moluccas.

References

Zeuzerinae
Moths described in 1957